Squeak! is a children's TV show made by SMG Productions (now known as STV Productions) for the ITV network children's strand CITV. The series re-broadcast in 2007 on STV, on their wknd@stv strand, and from 2014 as part of the "Weans' World" block on STV Glasgow and STV Edinburgh. There is a DVD boxset available which features all the episodes. Currently, Squeak! is also broadcast in the United States on BabyFirst TV.

The show follows three young mice Tizzy, Toot and Tog. They live in the "Tick Tock Clock".

References

External links 
Squeak! on STV Player
BBC ALBA - Bigeil

ITV children's television shows
Television shows produced by Scottish Television
British television shows featuring puppetry
Television series about mice and rats
2002 British television series debuts
PBS Kids shows